Friedhelm "Timo" Konietzka (2 August 1938 – 12 March 2012) was a German professional football player and manager who played as a striker. He earned his nickname "Timo" due to a supposed resemblance to the Soviet commander Semyon Timoshenko.

Biography 
Konietzka was born in Lünen, Province of Westphalia, and started his football career at his hometown club VfB 08 Lünen. In his youth (for five years since the age of 14) he worked in a coal mine. Max Merkel, coach of Borussia Dortmund at that time, discovered his talent when Konietzka was 20 and included him in the Dortmund squad. Together with fellow striker Jürgen Schütz, he formed the most dangerous attack of the Oberliga West. Konietzka played a total of 100 Bundesliga matches for Borussia Dortmund and TSV 1860 Munich and scored 72 goals, being the second best scorer of the league from 1964–1966 in the process. He was also capped nine times (three goals) for Germany between 1962 and 1965. Despite Konietzka's fine goalscoring record in the German league, German national team manager Sepp Herberger thought of him as too inconsistent, which could be one of the reasons Konietzka never featured regularly for the national side.

He won the German championship with Dortmund against 1. FC Köln in the last final before the introduction of the Bundesliga in 1963.

Konietzka earned his place in football history books when he scored the very first goal of the newly founded Bundesliga in the first minute of a match between Werder Bremen and Borussia Dortmund on 24 August 1963 (at 16:59 German time, as the game had started slightly earlier than scheduled). His biggest successes as a player were a DFB-Pokal title with Dortmund in 1965 and championship titles with Dortmund in 1963 and TSV 1860 Munich in 1966.

His coaching career included stints with Borussia Dortmund, Bayer Uerdingen, FC Zürich, BSC Young Boys and Grasshopper Club Zürich. He won three Swiss championships with FC Zürich between 1974 and 1976 and reached the semi-final of the 1976–77 European Cup, where his Zürich side was knocked out by English champions Liverpool. As coach of BSC Young Boys he twice reached the final of the Swiss Cup between 1978 and 1980.

Konietzka's wife is named Claudia. He took Swiss citizenship in 1988. With help of euthanasia-organisation Exit International, he chose to end his life at the age of 73 in Brunnen, Canton of Schwyz. He had been suffering from cancer prior to his death on 12 March 2012.

Honours

Player
Borussia Dortmund
West German champions: 1963
DFB-Pokal: 1964–65

1860 Munich
Bundesliga: 1965–66

Manager
FC Zürich
Nationalliga A: 1973–74, 1974–75, 1975–76

Grasshoppers
Nationalliga A: 1981–82

References

External links 
 
 
 
 Interview with German weekly magazine Stern 
 

1938 births
2012 suicides
People from Lünen
Sportspeople from Arnsberg (region)
German emigrants to Switzerland
German footballers
German football managers
Germany international footballers
German expatriate sportspeople in Switzerland
People from the Province of Westphalia
Bundesliga players
Borussia Dortmund players
TSV 1860 Munich players
FC Winterthur players
FC Zürich managers
BSC Young Boys managers
KSV Hessen Kassel managers
Borussia Dortmund managers
Grasshopper Club Zürich managers
FC Luzern managers
Bundesliga managers
Deaths by euthanasia
Suicides in Switzerland
KFC Uerdingen 05 managers
Association football forwards
Footballers from North Rhine-Westphalia